Trentini is an Italian surname. Notable people with the surname include:

Caroline Trentini (born 1987), Brazilian fashion model
Emma Trentini (1878–1959), Italian opera singer
Mauro Trentini (born 1975), Italian cyclist
Peggy Trentini (born 1968), American actress and model
Von Trentini, Noble Italian Family from Trentino Alto Adige

See also
Trentin

Italian-language surnames